Louis Bajard (2 February 1903 – 12 April 1967) was a French racing cyclist. He rode in the 1930 Tour de France.

References

1903 births
1967 deaths
French male cyclists
Place of birth missing